Richard Joseph Loftus (March 7, 1901 in Concord, Massachusetts – January 21, 1972), was a former professional baseball player who played outfield from for the Brooklyn Robins in the 1924 & 1925 seasons.

External links

1901 births
1972 deaths
Major League Baseball outfielders
Brooklyn Robins players
Baseball players from Massachusetts
People from Concord, Massachusetts
Sportspeople from Middlesex County, Massachusetts
Fitchburg Foxes players
Evansville Evas players
Bridgeport Americans players
Minneapolis Millers (baseball) players
Louisville Colonels (minor league) players
Reading Keystones players
New Haven Bulldogs players
Wilmington Pirates players
Waltham/Worcester Rosebuds players